Gustav "Måsen" Björk (10 July 1900 – 12 May 1928) was a Swedish football player, best known for being a prolific goalscorer for Hammarby IF. In 1921, he won two caps for the Sweden national football team.

Athletic career

Football
In 1916, at age 16, Björk was promoted to the senior squad of Hammarby IF. Björk soon became known as a prolific goalscorer and established himself as one of Hammarby's key players, together with goalkeeper Victor Olsson and defender Gösta Wihlborg.

In 1920, Hammarby debuted in the Svenska Serien, by then the highest league in Swedish football. The club finished third in the table, three points behind winners Örgryte. The same year, Björk won two caps for the Sweden national football team, featuring in two 0–3 losses against Norway and Finland

In 1922, Hammarby had an other strong showing where they went to the finals of Svenska Mästerskapet, a cup by then held to decide the Swedish champion, losing 1–3 to GAIS in a game where Björk scored the consolidation goal.

In 1924, Hammarby IF was one of the founding members of Allsvenskan, a new league that was established to determine the Swedish champion. He was forced to retire from football in 1925 due to suffering from diabetes.

Other sports
Like many footballers at the time, Björk also played bandy with Hammarby IF between 1918 and 1925.

In 1921, the club founded their ice hockey department, and on 7 March the same year, Björk became the very first goalscorer for Hammarby IF in a 7–5 win against IF Linnéa. He was part of their roster for two seasons in total.

Personal life
Björk died on 12 May 1928, aged 27, due to appendicitis.

Works cited

References

External links

1900 births
1928 deaths
Allsvenskan players
Association football forwards
Hammarby Fotboll players
Hammarby Hockey (1921–2008) players
Hammarby IF Bandy players
Footballers from Stockholm
Swedish bandy players
Swedish ice hockey players
Swedish footballers
Sweden international footballers
Deaths from appendicitis